The subdivisions of the Banovina of Croatia, an autonomous banate within the Kingdom of Yugoslavia, were districts, cities, municipalities, and cadastral municipalities.

On the first level, there were 99 districts (srez, pl. srezovi). On the second level, there were 25 cities (grad, pl. gradovi) and 693 municipalities (općina, pl. općine). On the third level, there were 3,703 cadastral municipalities.

List of cities and municipalities

See also 
 Administrative divisions of Croatia
 Administrative divisions of Yugoslavia

Footnotes

References 

 
 

Subdivisions of Croatia
Subdivisions of Yugoslavia
Croatia geography-related lists